Maryan or Meryan in Iran may refer to:
 Maryan, Ardabil
 Maryan, Gilan
 Meryan, alternate name of Aq Owlar, Gilan Province
 Maryan, Razavi Khorasan